The egg roll is a variety of deep-fried appetizer served in American Chinese restaurants.  It is a cylindrical, savory roll with shredded cabbage, chopped meat, or other fillings inside a thickly-wrapped wheat flour skin, which is fried in hot oil.  The dish is served warm, and is usually eaten with the fingers, dipped in duck sauce, soy sauce, plum sauce, or hot mustard, often from a cellophane packet. Egg rolls are a ubiquitous feature of American Chinese cuisine and are often served as free additions to American Chinese combination platters throughout the United States, along with fried rice and fortune cookies.

Provenance of the dish

The origins of the dish are unclear and remain disputed. Egg rolls are closely related to, but distinct from, the spring rolls served in mainland China, and were first seen in the early 20th century in the United States. An early reference to egg rolls appeared in a 1917 Chinese recipe pamphlet published in the United States, but the dish does not resemble the modern egg roll. The 1917 recipe described a meat and vegetable filling wrapped in an egg omelette, pan fried, and served in slices, similar to Gyeran-mari.

Andrew Coe, author of Chop Suey: A Cultural History of Chinese Food in the United States, has stated that the modern American egg roll was probably invented at a Chinese restaurant in New York City in the early 1930s, by one of two chefs who both later claimed credit for the creation: Lung Fong of Lung Fong's, or Henry Low of Port Arthur. According to Coe, Low's recipe, printed in a 1938 cookbook, Cook at Home in Chinese, included "bamboo shoots, roast pork, shrimp, scallions, water chestnuts, salt, MSG, sugar, palm oil, and pepper," but notably did not include cabbage, which is the main filling ingredient in modern egg rolls. 

Egg rolls do not typically contain egg in the filling.  In addition to the disputed origin of the dish, it is unclear how the word "egg" appeared in the name, since the predominant flavor in American egg rolls is cabbage, not eggs. A 1979 article in The Washington Post speculated two possible theories: 1) that the Chinese word for "egg" (蛋 dàn) sounds very similar to the Chinese word for "spring" (春 chūn), and 2) that Chinese chefs in the South relied on using actual eggs when trying to make the thin noodle skin from flour and water.

Other varieties of rolls
While there are many types of spring rolls native to East Asia and available in authentic Chinese, Thai, and Vietnamese restaurants in the United States, American egg rolls are distinctive. A typical "New York-style" egg roll measures approximately two inches in diameter by six inches in length, with a thick, chewy, crispy, bumpy exterior skin.  Egg rolls, like other Americanized Chinese food specialties, may contain vegetable cultivars and flavor profiles that are not common in China, including broccoli.

Restaurants that serve egg rolls occasionally also offer spring rolls as a separate menu option, and these spring rolls may be served with a cold filling wrapped in Banh trang rice paper wrappers (particularly at Vietnamese restaurants that serve both egg rolls and spring rolls as appetizers), or fried, as seen in some Thai and Chinese eateries. When fried, spring rolls served in Asian restaurants in the United States usually have a smaller diameter and a lighter, crispier skin made out of thinner sheets of wheat or rice dough.

See also

 Brik
 Chả giò
 Chiko Roll
 Chop suey
 Gyeran-mari
 List of deep fried foods
 List of stuffed dishes
 Lumpia
 Pastel
 Pizza Rolls
 Popiah
 Sambousa
 Spring roll
 Summer roll
 Yaka mein

References

Appetizers
American Chinese cuisine
Deep fried foods
Stuffed dishes